Dhruba Chandra Gautam is a Nepalese novel writer. He has authored over 60 stories and novels most of which addresses contemporary social issues.

Early Age 
Gautam was born on December 16, 1943 in Birgunj,Nepal . He used to write songs, poetry and plays from an early age. He grew up reading Nepali classics as well as the Hindi translations of the works of Bengali writers, Rabindranath Tagore and Bankim Chandra Chatterjee. 

In early 1960s , he moved to Kathmandu and published a poem in the literary magazine Ruprekha and a novel, Antya Pachi(). He earned a Master's degree in Nepali. He also taught at Tribhuvan University and some other private institutions. While in Kathmandu, he read the works of European writers such as Oscar Wilde, Franz Kafka, Jean-Paul Sartre and Sigmund Freud.

Professional Life 
In 1983 (2040 B.S.), He wrote Alikhit for which he was felicitated with the prestigious Madan Puraskar.

The Library of Congress, New Delhi has 1 to 32  works by him.

Notable Works
His works include:
Dapi(1976)
Kattel Sir ko Chot Patak(1980)
Alikhit(1983)
Agnidatta+Agnidatta(1996)
Swa. Hira Devi ko Khoji(1998)
Foolko Atanka(1999)
Tathakathit(2002)
Aakash Bibhajit Chha (10 co-authors)
Dhruba Chandra ka Ekaunna Katha
Tyo Euta Kura
Andhayaro Dipma
Gautamka Kehi Pratinidhi Katha

Awards 

 Sajha Purashkar (2004)
Madan Puraskar(2040 B.S.) for Alikhit

See also
List of Nepali writers
Parijat (writer)
Greta Rana
Toya Gurung
Laxmi Prasad Devkota

References

1943 births
Living people
Nepali-language writers
Nepalese educators
People from Parsa District
20th-century Nepalese male writers
Madan Puraskar winners
Sajha Puraskar winners